Stockfish is unsalted fish, especially cod, dried by cold air and wind on wooden racks (which are called "hjell" in Norway) on the foreshore. The drying of food is the world's oldest known preservation method, and dried fish has a storage life of several years. The method is cheap and effective in suitable climates; the work can be done by the fisherman and family, and the resulting product is easily transported to market.

Over the centuries, several variants of dried fish have evolved. The stockfish (fresh dried, not salted) category is often mistaken for the clipfish, or salted cod, category where the fish is salted before drying.  Salting was not economically feasible until the 17th century, when cheap salt from southern Europe became available to the maritime nations of northern Europe.

Stockfish is cured in a process called fermentation where cold-adapted bacteria matures the fish, similar to the maturing process of cheese.

In English legal records of the Medieval period, (written in Latin), stock fishmongers are differentiated from ordinary fishmongers when the occupation of a plaintiff or defendant is recorded.

Etymology

The word stockfish is a loan word from West Frisian stokfisk (stick fish), possibly referring to the wooden racks on which stockfish are traditionally dried or because the dried fish resembles a stick. "Stock" may also refer to a wooden yoke or harness on a horse or mule, once used to carry large fish from the sea or after drying/smoking for trade in nearby villages. This etymology is consistent with the fact that "Stockmaß" is German for the height of a horse at the withers.

Importance
Stockfish is Norway's longest sustained export commodity. Stockfish is first mentioned as a commodity in the 13th-century Icelandic prose work Egil's Saga, where chieftain Thorolf Kveldulfsson, in the year 875 AD, ships stockfish from Helgeland in mid-Norway to Britain. This product accounted for most of Norway's trade income from the Viking Age throughout the Medieval period.

Preserved cod fed Iceland for centuries, to the extent that it has been described as a local equivalent of bread.

Stockfish is extremely popular and is widely consumed in Catholic Mediterranean countries, mostly in Portugal and Italy. (Stockfish is called stoccafisso in most Italian dialects, but confusingly baccalà—which normally refers to salt cod—in the Veneto). In Russian cuisine dried stockfish is a very popular dish which is often eaten with vodka and beer. In the 16th century Russian and Swedish stockfish were sold to many European countries.

Stockfish is a staple of Nigerian cuisine.

Manufacturing and usage

The science of producing good stockfish is in many ways comparable to that of making a good cognac, Parma ham, or a well-matured cheese. Practitioners of the Slow Food movement insist that all these artisanal products must be made on a small scale and given time to mature.

The fish is prepared immediately after capture. After gutting the fish, it is either dried whole, or split along the spine leaving the tail connected. The fish is hung on the hjell from February to May. Stable cool weather protects the fish from insects and prevents an uncontrolled bacterial growth. A temperature just above zero degrees Celsius, with little rain, is ideal. Too much frost will spoil the fish, as ice destroys the fibers in the fish. The climate in northern Norway is excellent for stockfish production. Due to the stable conditions, the stockfish produced in Lofoten and Vesterålen is often regarded as the best. The traditional cod harvest in Lofoten also takes place during the best drying time. Due to a milder and more humid climate, salted/dried whitefish (klippfisk) was more common in the fisheries districts of Western Norway.

After its three months hanging on the hjell, the fish is then matured for another two to three months indoors in a dry and airy environment. During the drying, about 80% of the water in the fish evaporates. The stockfish retains all the nutrients from the fresh fish, only concentrated: it is therefore rich in proteins, vitamins, iron, and calcium.

After sorting by quality, most of the stockfish is exported to Italy, Croatia and Nigeria. In Norway and Iceland, the stockfish is mostly used as a snack and for lutefisk production. In Italy, the fish (called stoccafisso) is soaked and used in various courses, and is viewed as a delicacy.

Low-quality stockfish is also commonly used as supplemental food for pets, primarily as dog food or dog treats.

The 2012–2015 project SafeTrackFood developed a method of indoor production of stockfish to accelerate the maturing and drying of the fish in a safe manner.

Dishes

Baccalà alla vicentina, an ancient and traditional Italian dish native to Vicenza, is made from stockfish (confusingly  from dried and salted cod, although the salted form is known in standard Italian as baccalà), and is served on or next to polenta. In the Italian region of Basilicata, the so-called baccalà alla lucana is prepared with typical peppers called "cruschi" (dialect word for "crispy"). 
In Calabria stockfish is widely used, especially in the western side of the region: pasta with stockfish is a staple in Christmas Eve.
Dishes made from stockfish (locally called bakalar) are traditionally eaten on Christmas Eve in Croatia, especially Dalmatia.

In Catalonia, stockfish is an ingredient of a kind of surf and turf named es niu.

Stockfish is popular in West Africa, especially in Nigeria where it is used as flavor and fish in the many soups (sauces) like Egusi, Afang, Ukazi, Oha, Efo Riro, Okra, etc, that are eaten with fufu meals, such as pounded yam, fufu, and garri meals. It is the main ingredient in the Nigerian delicacy called "Ugba na Okporoko" or "ukazi" amongst the Igbo, Ibibio, Efik, Anang, Kalabari, Igbani, Ikwerre, etc, people of south eastern Nigeria. Most importers of "okporoko" are based in the town of Aba in Abia State. Among the Nri, Aro,   Nkwerre, and Umuahia people, at festive periods, the popular meal is the Ukazi soup which is usually well-garnished with okporoko or Cod as it is popularly called. The Kwe people, who are a fishing people of the English-speaking part of Cameroon, use stockfish in flavoring their palm nut or banga, which can be eaten with a cocoyam pudding called kwacoco. The name okporoko for stockfish, among the Igbo of Nigeria refers to the sound the hard fish makes in the pot and literally translates as "that which produces sound in the pot".

Both stockfish and salt cod can be made into lutefisk.

Gallery

See also

 Boknafisk
 Bugeo – similarly dried Alaska pollock
 List of dried foods
 Lofoten Stockfish Museum

Notes

References

 Kurlansky, Mark (1997). Cod: A Biography of the Fish That Changed the World. New York: Walker. .
 Silva, António J. M. da, In the Shadow of the Salt Cod. Writing vs Staging the Stockfish History in the Iberian Peninsula, TAE - Trabalhos de Antropologia e de Etnologia , vol. 61, 2021, pp. 167–209. PDF
 http://www.safetrackfood.eu/ 

Dried fish
Snack foods
Fish processing